Militia Christi is an Italian gothic rock/dark ambient musical project whose lyrics, sung in Italian and Latin, deal with Mysticism, Gnosticism, Hermetism, Rosicrucianism, Alchemy, Theosophy, Philosophy, Knights Templar and Freemasonry. They seem to have a very strong connection with the Italian extreme gothic metal band Theatres des Vampires.

The origin of the band and the real name of its members are still unknown. They have never performed live.

Musical style

Their music is a mix of Dark Ambient and Gothic rock with some black metal influences.

Discography

 Ordo Militia Templi (2001)
 Non timor domini, non timor malus (2004)

References
 

Italian musical groups
Musical groups established in 2001